The 1988 CONCACAF Under-20 Championship was held in Guatemala, although it has also been reported that the tournament was held in Trinidad and Tobago. It also served as qualification for the 1989 FIFA World Youth Championship.

Qualification

|}

Other qualification matches may have been played.

Teams
The following teams entered the tournament:

Round 1

Group 1

Group 2

Final round

Mexico disqualification

Qualification to World Youth Championship
The two best performing teams qualified for the 1989 FIFA World Youth Championship.

 
  (replacing Mexico, who were disqualified)

References

1988
1988 in youth association football